Martin Kohlmaier (born May 30, 1984) is an Austrian basketball player. He currently plays for the Kapfenberg Bulls and the Austria national basketball team.

Honours
2x Austrian League (2003, 2004)
Austrian Cup (2014)
2x Austrian Supercup (2002, 2003)
Individual awards
ÖBL Austrian MVP (2014)

External links
Profile – Eurobasket.com

1984 births
Living people
Kapfenberg Bulls players
Austrian men's basketball players
Austrian expatriate sportspeople in Spain
Expatriate basketball people in Spain
Sportspeople from Villach
Centers (basketball)
UB La Palma players
CB Tarragona players